A reaction inhibitor is a substance that decreases the rate of, or prevents, a chemical reaction.
A catalyst, in contrast, is a substance that increases the rate of a chemical reaction.

Examples
 Added acetanilide slows the decomposition of drug-store hydrogen peroxide solution, inhibiting the reaction
2 → 2 + , which is catalyzed by heat, light, and impurities.

Inhibition of a catalyst
An inhibitor can reduce the effectiveness of a catalyst in a catalysed reaction (either a non-biological catalyst or an enzyme). E.g., if a compound is so similar to (one of) the reactants that it can bind to the active site of a catalyst but does not undergo a catalytic reaction then that catalyst molecule cannot perform its job because the active site is occupied. When the inhibitor is released, the catalyst is again available for reaction.

Inhibition and catalyst poisoning
Inhibition should be distinguished from catalyst poisoning. An inhibitor only hinders the working of a catalyst without changing it, whilst in catalyst poisoning the catalyst undergoes a chemical reaction that is irreversible in the environment in question (the active catalyst may only be regained by a separate process).

Potency

Index inhibitors or simplified as inhibitor predictably inhibit metabolism via a given pathway and are commonly used in prospective clinical drug-drug interaction studies.

Inhibitors of CYP can be classified by their potency, such as:
Strong inhibitor being one that causes at least a 5-fold increase in the plasma AUC values, or more than 80% decrease in clearance of substrates  ( Over 1.8 times slower than usual clearance rate.) .
Moderate inhibitor being one that causes at least a 2-fold increase in the plasma AUC values, or 50-80% decrease in clearance of substrates ( At least 1.5-1.8 times slower than usual clearance speed.) .
Weak inhibitor being one that causes at least a 1.25-fold but less than 2-fold increase in the plasma AUC values, or 20-50% decrease in clearance of substrates ( At least 1.2-1.5 times slower than usual clearance rate.) .

See also
 Enzyme inhibition
 Catalyst poisoning

References

Catalysis